The following are notable boarding schools in India.

Andhra Pradesh

 Oakridge International School – Visakhapatnam
 The Peepal Grove School – Gingival Palli

Bihar

Delhi and NCR 

 The British Co-Ed High School – Patiala
 Cambridge School Srinivaspuri – Delhi
 Colonel Satsangi's Kiran Memorial Public School - Delhi
 Mann Public School – Delhi

Gujarat

 Rajkumar College – Rajkot
 Vibgyor High School – Vadodara

Haryana

 Gita Niketan Awasiya Vidyalaya – Kurukshetra
 Modern Vidya Niketan – Faridabad
 Motilal Nehru School of Sports Rai, ( MNSS) Sonipat 
 The Sanskriti School – Rohtak
 Vidya Devi Jindal School, Hisar – Hisar
 Vidya Sanskar International School – Faridabad

Himachal Pradesh

 Army Public School, Dagshai – Solan
 Bishop Cotton School – Shimla
 Chail Military School – Chail
 Chinmaya Vidyalaya Nauni – Shimla
 Him Academy Public School – Hamirpur (HP)
 Lawrence School, Sanawar 
 Pinegrove School – Solan
 Sainik School, Sujanpur Tihra
 St. Mary's Convent School

Jharkhand

 Netarhat Residential School – Netarhat
 Ramakrishna Mission Vidyapith – Deoghar
 Vikas Vidyalaya – Ranchi

Karnataka

 Baldwin Boys High School – Bangalore
 Bangalore Military School – Bangalore
 Belgaum Military School – Belgaum
 Canadian International School – Bangalore
 Candor International School – Bangalore
 Greenwood High International School – Bangalore
 Jain Heritage School – Bangalore
 Jain International Residential School – Bangalore
 Sarala Birla Academy – Bangalore
 Treamis World School – Bangalore
 Trio World Academy – Bangalore

Kerala

 Loyola School, Thiruvananthapuram
 Sainik School, Kazhakootam - Thiruvananthapuram
 St. Peters School, Kadayiruppu
 St. Thomas Residential School, Thiruvananthapuram

Maharashtra

 Anubhuti School – Jalgaon
 Barnes School – Devlali, Nasik
 B K Birla Centre For Education - near Pune
 Sahyadri School – Pune
 Shri Shivaji Preparatory Military School (Pune)
 UWC Mahindra College – near Pune

Madhya Pradesh

 Daly College - Indore
 Sainik School, Rewa
 Scindia School - Gwalior
 Scindia Kanya Vidyalaya - Gwalior

Odisha

 Aparna World School – Jharsuguda
 KIIT International School – Bhubaneswar
 SAI International Residential School – Bhubaneswar

Rajasthan
 Ajmer Military School – Ajmer
 Birla Balika Vidyapeeth – Pilani
 Birla Public School – Pilani
 Birla Senior Secondary School – Pilani
 Dholpur Military School – Dholpur
 Heritage Girls School – Udaipur, Rajasthan
 Maharani Gayatri Devi Girls' Public School (MGD) – Jaipur
 Mayo College – Ajmer
 Mayo College Girls School – Ajmer
 Neerja Modi School – Jaipur
 St. Mary's High School – Mt. Abu

Tamil Nadu

 Campion Anglo-Indian Higher Secondary School – Tiruchirapalli
 Chennai Public School – Chennai
 Chinmaya International Residential School – Siruvani, Coimbatore
 Good Shepherd International School – Ooty
 Hebron School – Ooty
 Kodaikanal International School – Kodaikanal
 Laidlaw Memorial School and Junior College, The – Ketti
 Lawrence School, Lovedale – Ooty
 Samaritan Residential Schools – Elagiri Hills
 SSVM Institutions –  Mettupalayam, Coimbatore
 St. Peter's International School – Kodaikanal

Telangana

 Abhyasa Residential Public School – Toopran, Medak
 Aga Khan Academy – Hyderabad
 The Hyderabad Public School, Begumpet – Hyderabad
 Walden's Path – Hyderabad

Uttar Pradesh

 La Martiniere College - Lucknow
 Shanti Niketan Vidhyapeeth – Meerut
 Shri Ramswaroop Memorial Public School – Lucknow
 Suditi Global Academy – Mainpuri
 Vardhman Academy – Meerut

Uttarakhand

 The Aryan School – Dehradun
 Ashok Hall Girls' Residential School – Ranikhet
 The Asian School – Dehradun
 Birla Vidya Mandir – Nainital
 Colonel Brown Cambridge School – Dehradun
 Convent of Jesus and Mary – Mussoorie
 The Doon School – Dehradun
 Ecole Globale International Girls' School – Dehradun
 G. D. Birla Memorial School – Ranikhet
 Manava Bharati India International School – Mussoorie
 Mussoorie International School – Mussoorie
 Oak Grove School - Mussoorie
 Rashtriya Indian Military College – Dehradun
 The Royal College, Dehradun
 St. George's College – Mussoorie
 St Joseph's College – Nainital
 St. Mary's Convent High School – Nainital
 SelaQui International School – Dehradun
 Sherwood College – Nainital
 Tula's International School – Dehradun
 Unison World School – Dehradun
 Welham Boys' School – Dehradun
 Welham Girls' School – Dehradun
 Woodstock School – Mussoorie
 Wynberg Allen School – Mussoorie

West Bengal

 Dr. Graham's Homes, Kalimpong
 Goethals Memorial School – Kurseong
 Ramakrishna Mission Vidyalaya, Narendrapur
 Ramakrishna Mission Vidyapith, Purulia 
 Sainik School, Purulia
 St. Augustine's School, Kalimpong 
 St. Joseph's School, Darjeeling
 St. Paul's School, Darjeeling

Multiple locations

 Bivha International School – multiple locations
 La Martiniere College
 La Martiniere Calcutta
 La Martiniere Lucknow

See also
 Delhi Public School Society
 List of schools in India
 List of boarding schools
 List of international schools in India

References

 
Boarding
India